Copake Memorial Clock, also known as the Copake Clock, is a historic freestanding clock located at Copake, Columbia County, New York.  It was erected in 1944 as a memorial to those lost in World War II, and is a four sided pedestal-type, memorial chime clock.  The metal object consisting of a base, plinth, and column topped by a copper and glass clock was manufactured by the O. C. McClintock Company of Minneapolis, Minnesota.

The death of Steven McIntyre in action in Italy during World War II inspired his uncle, Ed McIntyre, and Albert C. Bristol to spearhead a drive to create a memorial clock for all those from Copake who served in wartime.  The cost of the clock — $2,600 —was a large sum at the time, especially considering world events of the day. The date of the original dedication was Oct. 29, 1944, while the U.S. was still at war.

In addition to Copake residents who served in World Wars I and II, the monument also contains plaques listing those who served in Korea and Vietnam.

The clock was rededicated in June 2011 after a complete restoration. The community raised $42,000, to replace the works and the chime unit, rebuild the entire clock body and pedestal, and restore the stained glass.

It was added to the National Register of Historic Places in 2012.

References 

Buildings and structures on the National Register of Historic Places in New York (state)
Clock towers in New York (state)
Buildings and structures completed in 1944
Buildings and structures in Columbia County, New York
National Register of Historic Places in Columbia County, New York